The red-browed treecreeper (Climacteris erythrops) is a species of bird in the family Climacteridae.
It is endemic to temperate and subtropical eastern Australia.
It is found in mature eucalypt forests and woodlands in both coastal and mountainous regions, from central Victoria to south-eastern Queensland.

Diet 
It feeds on Invertebrates.

Description 
It has a dark brown back and a red brow above its eye.

References

External links
 Image and Classification at Animal Diversity Web

red-browed treecreeper
Birds of New South Wales
Birds of Victoria (Australia)
Endemic birds of Australia
red-browed treecreeper
Taxonomy articles created by Polbot